Group F of the 2019 AFC Asian Cup took place from 9 to 17 January 2019. The group consisted of Japan, Uzbekistan, Oman and Turkmenistan. The top two teams, Japan and Uzbekistan, along with third-placed Oman (as one of the four best third-placed teams), advanced to the round of 16.

Japan was the only former champions and are also the team which won the most titles in the Asian Cup (1992, 2000, 2004 and 2011).

Teams

Notes

Standings

In the round of 16:
 The winners of Group F, Japan, advanced to play the runners-up of Group E, Saudi Arabia.
 The runners-up of Group F, Uzbekistan, advanced to play the runners-up of Group B, Australia.
 The third-placed team of Group F, Oman, advanced to play the winners of Group D, Iran (as one of the four best third-placed teams).

Matches
All times listed are GST (UTC+4).

Japan vs Turkmenistan
 
In the 12th minute, Japan had the first chance of the game, with Ritsu Dōan failing to beat Mammet Orazmuhammedow with a close-range header following a Takehiro Tomiyasu pass. Wahyt Orazsähedow forced Shūichi Gonda into a fine save and Mekan Saparow headed over from the resulting corner. Turkmenistan continued to press and took the lead on 27 minutes when captain Arslanmyrat Amanow unleashed a long-range effort into the net. Then, Yuya Osako's effort came narrowly wide, before Orazmuhammedow denied Tomiyasu with a fingertip save. As half-time approached, Turkmenistan came close to doubling their advantage. This time, Ahmet Ataýew stung Gonda's palms with an angled drive. After that, a header from Genki Haraguchi sailed inches wide off the target. In the 56th minute, Osako turned in the area and fired home to equalise the scoreline. Four minutes later Japan took the lead when Saparow's blunder allowed Yuto Nagatomo to find Osako, who scored to bag his second goal of the match. Shortly after, Takumi Minamino found Dōan, who spun away from his marker and fired into the bottom corner beyond Orazmuhammedow's dive. On 79 minutes, Ataýew converted from the spot after Gonda had up-ended substitute Altymyrat Annadurdyýew in the area. Japan held the scoreline to win the match.

Uzbekistan vs Oman
In the 14th minute, Oman came close to scoring through Ahmed Kano’s header which was saved by Uzbek goalkeeper Ignatiy Nesterov. In the 25th minute, Saad Al-Mukhaini’s delivery from the right flank sailed for Raed Ibrahim Saleh but the forward failed to connect. Uzbekistan found the back of the net through Odil Ahmedov’s free kick from 25 yards out, the Uzbekistan captain picking up his 18th international goal after he curled his effort past goalkeeper Faiz Al-Rushaidi. Nesterov blocked Mohammed Al-Musalami’s low drive as Uzbekistan took a 1–0 lead into the break. Oman came close to scoring when Ali Al-Busaidi sent a cross which found Al-Mukhaini who wasted the opportunity. Two minutes later, the defender was in goal-scoring range but saw his effort blocked. Oman finally beat Nesterov in the 72nd minute after substitute Muhsen Al-Ghassani, beat the offside trap to score past the Uzbekistan shot stopper. Five minutes from time, Eldor Shomurodov burst into the box and tried a left-footed shot that Al-Rushaidi got a hand to but failed to keep out as he was beaten at his near post. Uzbekistan, however, suffered a blow when Egor Krimets was sent off deep in stoppage time.

Oman vs Japan
Genki Haraguchi diverted Ritsu Dōan’s cross onto the bar from six yards inside the first two minutes. On 20 minutes, Salaah Al-Yahyaei found Muhsen Al-Ghassani, who rounded Shūichi Gonda but was unable to finish from a tight angle. Japan broke the deadlock in the 28th minute, Haraguchi picked himself up after being up-ended in the area by Raed Ibrahim Saleh to ram home the resulting spot-kick beyond Faiz Al-Rushaidi’s dive. With half-time approaching, Al-Yahyaei’s drive was diverted to safety by Yuto Nagatomo as Japan maintained their slender lead going into the break. In the second ha;f, Saad Al-Mukhaini’s effort at 70 minutes was gathered by Gonda. An acrobatic Saleh attempt from an Al-Mukhaini cross 10 minutes later and Al-Rushaidi’s last gasp save from substitute Junya Ito proved to be the final goalmouth action of the day.

Turkmenistan vs Uzbekistan

The two Turkic neighbours have met each other in 2004 edition, where Uzbekistan prevailed with a 1–0 win.

Dostonbek Khamdamov’s header hit the ground before rebounding over the crossbar in the fifth minute. In the 16th minute, a string of passes ended with Javokhir Sidikov sliding the ball into an unguarded goalmouth. Eight minutes later, Otabek Shukurov sent a through pass down the middle to Eldor Shomurodov, whose effort made its way past goalkeeper Mammet Orazmuhammedow. Five minute before the break, Gurbangeldi Batyrow’s poor clearance allowed Jaloliddin Masharipov to let fly a half-volley to make it 3–0. Less than two minutes later, Masharipov turned provider with his pass finding Shomurodov, who scored his second of the night. Khamdamov's 44th minute strike was denied by the upright. Orazmuhammedow made a double save in the 55th minute to maintain the scoreline.

Oman vs Turkmenistan
In the sixth minute, Muhsen Al-Ghassani's left-footed shot from the centre of the box was saved by goalkeeper Mammet Orazmuhammedow. In the 20th minute, Ahmed Kano scored a free kick from 25 yards out. In the 31st minute, Myrat Ýagşyýew's header was tipped over by goalkeeper Faiz Al-Rushaidi. Turkmenistan equalised in the 41st minute with Altymyrat Annadurdyýew evading several Oman players before unleashing his shot from the left into the top left corner. Oman came close in the 55th and 56th minutes - through a header by Mohammed Al-Musalami and a shot by Khalid Al-Hajri respectively. Muhsen went for the spectacular in the 68th minute with an overhead kick which Orazmuhammedow saved and the goalkeeper stood tall again just seconds later to deny Kano on the left, with the ball seemingly headed for the top of the net. Orazmuhammedow, however, was finally beaten in the 84th minute with Muhsen sweeping the ball in after the goalkeeper had parried an initial effort. Three minutes into added time, Al-Musalami jumped high to head home Oman's third goal of the day to gain the win, and more importantly, guiding Oman to the round of sixteen for the first time ever in the country's football history, having failed in three previous editions.

Japan vs Uzbekistan
Koya Kitagawa forced Ignatiy Nesterov into action 10 minutes before the break when his shot on the turn was tipped over by the keeper. With five minutes left in the half, Uzbekistan took the lead, Eldor Shomurodov latched on to Dostonbek Khamdamov’s through ball to outpace Tomoaki Makino before stepping inside Genta Miura and clipping the finish into the top corner with the outside of his right boot. The lead, though, was to last only three minutes as Sei Muroya turned on the left touchline before outstripping Farrukh Sayfiev and sending over a cross towards Yoshinori Muto, who rose to power his header home. Nesterov parried Junya Ito’s shot nine minutes after the restart while Muto went close seconds later, shooting just over the bar. Two minutes before the hour mark Tsukasa Shiotani's left-foot strike from distance curled away from Nesterov to put Japan in front. Davron Khashimov forced Daniel Schmidt to tip his long-range drive over the bar in the final minutes as Japan closed out the game to take their third win in a row and advance to the next round with a perfect record.

Discipline
Fair play points were used as tiebreakers if the head-to-head and overall records of teams were tied (and if a penalty shoot-out was not applicable as a tiebreaker). These were calculated based on yellow and red cards received in all group matches as follows:
yellow card = 1 point
red card as a result of two yellow cards = 3 points
direct red card = 3 points
yellow card followed by direct red card = 4 points

Only one of the above deductions was applied to a player in a single match.

References

External links
 

Group F
2019 in Japanese football
2019 in Uzbekistani sport
2018–19 in Omani football